Victoria Point may refer to:

Victoria Point, Queensland, a suburb of Redland City, Australia
Victoria Point (building), a 42-storey residential tower in Melbourne Docklands, Australia
The southernmost tip of Tanintharyi Division (formerly Tenassarim), Myanmar, now known as Kawthaung